
Przysucha County is a unit of territorial administration and local government (powiat) in Masovian Voivodeship, east-central Poland. It came into being on January 1, 1999, as a result of the Polish local government reforms passed in 1998.

As of 2019 its total population is 41,721, out of which the population of Przysucha is 5,818, and the rural population is 35,903.

Neighbouring counties
Przysucha County is bordered by Grójec County to the north, Białobrzegi County to the north-east, Radom County to the east, Szydłowiec County to the south-east, Końskie County to the south-west, and Opoczno County and Tomaszów Mazowiecki County to the west.

Administrative division
The county is subdivided into eight gminas (one urban-rural and seven rural). These are listed in the following table, in descending order of population.

References

 
Przysucha